Kevin Gravel (born March 6, 1992) is an American professional ice hockey defenseman who is currently playing for the Milwaukee Admirals in the American Hockey League (AHL) while under contract to the Nashville Predators of the National Hockey League (NHL). He was selected by the Los Angeles Kings in the fifth-round (148th overall) of the 2010 NHL Entry Draft.

Playing career

Amateur
While playing for the Marquette Rangers in the North American Hockey League, Gravel committed to play for his fathers Alma mater St. Cloud State University. Gravel then played with the Sioux City Musketeers in the United States Hockey League for the 2009–10 season. In his first season, he was selected for the USHL All-Star Game and the World Junior A Challenge.

Gravel played four season for the St. Cloud State University Huskies, where he was named to the All-WCHA Academic Team for the 2012 and 2013 season. He also helped the Huskies qualify for the 2013 Frozen Four and win an NCAA regional title game in 2014.

Professional
After his senior year, Gravel continued his 2013–14 season by signing an amateur try-out contract with the Manchester Monarchs of the AHL.
On August 4, 2014, Gravel continued within the Los Angeles Kings organization, agreeing to a one-year AHL contract with the Monarchs, the Kings' affiliate. In his first full professional season in 2014–15, Gravel established a position on the blueline with the Monarchs, contributing to the club's first Calder Cup Championship in their last season in the AHL.

On July 2, 2015, the Los Angeles Kings signed Gravel to a two-year entry-level contract. To begin the 2015–16 season, Gravel was reassigned to new AHL affiliate, the Ontario Reign. After 42 games with the Reign, Gravel received his first NHL recall to the Kings on February 11, 2016. Gravel recorded his first NHL goal on February 23, 2017 in a game against the Boston Bruins.

During the summer before the 2017–18 season, Gravel was diagnosed with crohn’s disease. He lost around 40 pounds, was hospitalized, and missed more than a month of training. On July 1, 2018, Gravel signed as a free agent to a one-year, two-way contract with the Edmonton Oilers. After attending the Oilers 2018 training camp, Gravel began the 2018–19 season with AHL affiliate, the Bakersfield Condors. Contributing with 1 assist in 5 games, Gravel was soon recalled by the Oilers and remained with the club for the duration of the year, recording 3 assists in 36 games.

As a free agent from the Oilers, Gravel agreed to a one-year, $700,000 contract with the Toronto Maple Leafs on July 24, 2019. He made 3 appearances with the Maple Leafs during an injury plagued 2019–20 season, featuring more prominently with AHL affiliate, the Toronto Marlies, with 3 points in 23 regular season games.

Un-signed leading into the pandemic delayed 2020–21 season, Gravel returned to former AHL club in the Bakersfield Condors after agreeing to a one-year contract on January 26, 2021.

After successful stint with the Condors, Gravel was signed as a free agent in returning to the NHL by securing a one-year, two-way contract with the Calgary Flames on July 28, 2021.

Following the conclusion of his contract with the Flames, Gravel as a free agent was signed to a two-year, two-way contract with the Nashville Predators on July 13, 2022.

Career statistics

Regular season and playoffs

International

Awards and honors

References

External links
 

1992 births
Living people
American men's ice hockey defensemen
Bakersfield Condors players
Edmonton Oilers players
Ice hockey players from Michigan
Los Angeles Kings draft picks
Los Angeles Kings players
Manchester Monarchs (AHL) players
Milwaukee Admirals players
Nashville Predators players
Ontario Reign (AHL) players
People from Kingsford, Michigan
St. Cloud State Huskies men's ice hockey players
Sioux City Musketeers players
Stockton Heat players
Toronto Maple Leafs players
Toronto Marlies players